This is a list of blackface minstrel troupes.

 Adams and Lee
 Backus' Minstrels
 Brooker and Clayton's Georgia Minstrels
 Bryant's Minstrels
 Buckley's Serenaders (a.k.a. Buckley's Congo Melodists, Buckley's New Orleans Serenaders, New Orleans Serenaders)
 Callender's Georgia Minstrels
 Campbell's Minstrels
 Christy Minstrels (a.k.a. George Christy Minstrels)
 Duprez & Benedict's Minstrels
 Ethiopian Serenaders (a.k.a. Boston Minstrels, Ethiopian Melodists, Ethiopian Minstrels)
 Gavitt's Original Ethiopian Serenaders
 George Mitchell Minstrels
 Georgia Minstrels, later Haverly's European Minstrels
 Haverly's United Mastodon Minstrels
 Honey Boy Hotchkiss Minstrels
 Kunkel's Nightingales
 Madame Rentz's Female Minstrels
 Ole Bull Band of Serenaders
 Ordway's Aeolians
 Sable Brothers and Sisters
 Sable Harmonists
 San Francisco Minstrels
 Sanford's Opera Troupe (a.k.a. Sanford's Minstrels)
 Virginia Minstrels (a.k.a. Virginia Serenaders)
 White's Serenaders (a.k.a. White's Minstrels)
 Wood's Minstrels (a.k.a. Christy and Wood's Minstrels)

See also
 List of entertainers known to have performed in blackface

References

 
Blackface minstrel troupes